Monteluco  is a frazione (borough) of the comune of Spoleto, in Umbria, central Italy. Having a population of just 27, it is located on a limestone mountain covered by woods, at 780 meters over the sea level.

The name derives from the Latin lucus, meaning a wood sacred to Jupiter. At the entrance of the wood was found a stone copy of the Lex luci spoletina, written in Old Latin and dating to the 3rd century BC. St. Francis of Assisi lived here for a short period in 1218.

Sights include:
Convent of St. Francis (13th century)
Romanesque church of St. Peter (5th century), in Romanesque style
Church of St. Julian (12th century), in Romanesque style, built over a pre-existing 6th century. The interior is on a nave and two aisles, with semicircular apses and a crypt
Grottoes of the Hermits

Spoleto